Gonimbrasia is a genus of moths in the family Saturniidae first described by Arthur Gardiner Butler in 1878.

Species
Gonimbrasia abayana (Rougeot, 1977)
Gonimbrasia alcestris Weymer, 1907
Gonimbrasia annulata Bouvier, 1936
Gonimbrasia balachowskyi Rougeot, 1973
Gonimbrasia belina (Westwood, 1849) – mopane worm
Gonimbrasia birbiri (Bouvier, 1929)
Gonimbrasia cocaulti Darge & Terral, 1993
Gonimbrasia congolensis Bouvier, 1927
Gonimbrasia conradsi Rebel, 1906
Gonimbrasia deborah (Weymer, 1886)
Gonimbrasia ellisoni Lemaire, 1962
Gonimbrasia fletcheri Rougeot, 1960
Gonimbrasia fucata Rougeot, 1978
Gonimbrasia godarti Lemaire, 1971
Gonimbrasia hecate Rougeot, 1955
Gonimbrasia huebneri Kirby, 1877
Gonimbrasia miranda Darge, 2005
Gonimbrasia nictitans (Fabricius, 1775)
Gonimbrasia osiris Druce, 1896
Gonimbrasia pales (Weymer, 1909)
Gonimbrasia rectilineata Sonthonnax, 1901
Gonimbrasia ruandana Gaede, 1927
Gonimbrasia said (Oberthuer, 1878)
Gonimbrasia tyrrhea (Cramer, 1775)
Gonimbrasia ufipana Strand, 1911
Gonimbrasia ukerewensis Rebel, 1922
Gonimbrasia zambesina (Walker, 1865)

References

Saturniinae